Odo Chabi Bio (born 25 September 2000) is a Beninese footballer who plays as a striker for Coton.

Career

Chabi started his career with Beninese third tier side Asso de Natitingou. In 2018, he signed for Soleil in the Beninese top flight. Before the second half of 2019–20, Chabi signed for Tahitian club Tiare Tahiti. Before the second half of 2021–22, he signed for Coton in Benin.

References

External links

 

2000 births
Association football forwards
Benin international footballers
Benin Premier League players
Beninese expatriate footballers
Beninese footballers
Expatriate footballers in French Polynesia
Living people
Soleil FC players